Yang Yan is the name of:

Yang Yan (empress) (238–274), wife of Emperor Wu of Jin
Yang Yan (Tang dynasty) (727–781), politician of the Tang dynasty
Yang Yan (wheelchair basketball) (born 1998), Chinese wheelchair basketball player

See also
Yang Yang (disambiguation)